Adyge-Khabl (Adıge-Xabl) is a rural locality (an aul) and the administrative center of Adyge-Khablsky District of the Karachay-Cherkess Republic, Russia. Population:  The postal code is 369330.

Demographics
In 2002, the population comprised the following ethnic groups:
Cherkess (49.4%)
Nogais (18.2%)
Russians (12.4%)
Abazins (9.0%)
Karachays (2.0%)
Others (9%)

References

Rural localities in Karachay-Cherkessia